Chi Geminorum (χ Gem) is a binary star system in the constellation Gemini, near the western border with Cancer. It can be viewed with the naked eye on a dark night, having an apparent visual magnitude of 4.98. Based upon an annual parallax shift of 12.73 mas, it is located roughly 260 light years from the Sun.

The two components of this system form a spectroscopic binary with an orbital period of 2,437.8 days and an eccentricity of 0.06. The primary component is a K-type giant star with a stellar classification of K2 III. This is a candidate mild Barium star with the slight overabundance most likely acquired through accretion from what is now a white dwarf companion. The primary has an estimated 1.83 times the mass of the Sun and has expanded to 14 times the Sun's radius. The effective temperature of the outer atmosphere is 4,560 K, from whence it radiates 79 times the solar luminosity. It has a leisurely projected rotational velocity of 3.8 km/s and is around two billion years old.

References

K-type giants
Barium stars
Spectroscopic binaries
Gemini (constellation)
Geminorum, Chi
BD+28 1532
Cancri, 06
066216
039424
03149